Brezno District is a district in
the Banská Bystrica Region of central Slovakia. It was first established in 1923 and in its present borders exists from 1996.

Municipalities

References

Districts of Slovakia
Geography of Banská Bystrica Region